Allegheny Creek is an  tributary of the Schuylkill River in Berks County, Pennsylvania in the United States.

Allegheny Creek joins the Schuylkill River at the village of Gibraltar.

It is crossed by the Allegheny Aqueduct, built as part of the Schuylkill Canal in 1824.

See also
List of rivers of Pennsylvania

References

External links
U.S. Geological Survey: PA stream gaging stations

Rivers of Berks County, Pennsylvania
Rivers of Pennsylvania
Tributaries of the Schuylkill River